Robh Ruppel is an American artist best known for his work on role-playing game products. Critic Joseph Szadkowski of The Washington Times has referred to him as a "horror genius".

Early life 
Robh Ruppel grew up in Bellaire, Texas, and attended High School for the Performing and Visual Arts in Houston. His parents were Roger (an architect) and Judy Ruppel.

Career
Robh Ruppel worked for TSR for several years beginning in 1992, producing cover and interior art for products from the Forgotten Realms, Dragonlance, and Ravenloft settings, among others. In 1994, he began producing artwork for the Planescape setting as well, which constituted the majority of this career with TSR. When TSR was purchased by Wizards of the Coast, he also illustrated cards for Magic: The Gathering.

Ruppel worked as a teacher at the Art Center College of Design in Pasadena, California, where he previously studied industrial design and illustration as a student.

Robh Ruppel is a production designer and concept artist working in games and feature films. He art directed Meet the Robinsons and Brother Bear for Disney. He won Best Art Direction for Uncharted 2.

Works

Roleplaying games
The Gothic Earth Gazetteer (1995)

References

External links

1960s births
High School for the Performing and Visual Arts alumni
Living people
People from Bellaire, Texas
Role-playing game artists